Greatest Hits is the first greatest hits package released by American country music artist Joe Diffie. Released in 1998 on Epic Records, it contains the biggest hit singles from his first five studio albums, as well as three new tracks ("Poor Me", "Texas Size Heartache", and "Hurt Me All the Time"), of which the first two were released as singles.

Don Cook and Lonnie Wilson produced the new recordings.

Track listing

Personnel
The following musicians performed on the tracks "Texas Size Heartache", "Poor Me", and "Hurt Me All the Time".
Al Anderson – acoustic guitar, electric guitar
Bruce C. Bouton – pedal steel guitar
Mark Casstevens – acoustic guitar
Joe Diffie – lead vocals, background vocals
Larry Franklin – fiddle, mandolin
Paul Franklin – pedal steel guitar
John Barlow Jarvis – Hammond B-3 organ, Wurlitzer
Liana Manis – background vocals
Brent Mason – electric guitar
Steve Nathan – piano
Lonnie Wilson – drums, percussion
Glenn Worf – bass guitar

Chart performance

Weekly charts

Year-end charts

References

1998 greatest hits albums
Joe Diffie albums
Albums produced by Bob Montgomery (songwriter)
Epic Records compilation albums